WLBL (930 AM) is a  radio station licensed to Auburndale, Wisconsin, serving Stevens Point and Wisconsin Rapids. The station is part of Wisconsin Public Radio (WPR), and airs WPR's "Ideas Network", consisting of news and talk programming.

WLBL is the second-oldest station in the Wisconsin Public Radio network. It traces its history to WPAH in Waupaca, which was licensed to the Wisconsin Department of Markets, and began broadcasting on February 5, 1923. The Department later moved its operations to Stevens Point and changed the calls to WLBL in May 1924.  In 1932, it began sharing programs with Madison's WHA—the ancestor of today's Wisconsin Public Radio network.  Owned for many years by the state Commerce Department, it is now owned by the Wisconsin Educational Communications Board.

WLBL must power down to 70 watts at sunset, resulting in spotty coverage even in Wisconsin Rapids and missing Stevens Point altogether.  During the fall, winter, early spring, and late summer, it is allowed to boost its power to 500 watts at 06:00, then go to full power at sunrise.  Because of this, the full Ideas Network schedule is heard on two FM translators, 100.9 Marshfield and 99.1 Stevens Point, and on the third HD subchannel of Wausau's WHRM-FM (90.9), a sister station to WLBL which carries WPR's NPR News and Classical service.

Notes

References

External links
Wisconsin Public Radio

LBL
Wisconsin Public Radio
NPR member stations
Radio stations established in 1923
1923 establishments in Wisconsin